The Minister for Women's Safety and the Prevention of Domestic and Sexual Violence, is a minister in the Government of New South Wales who has responsibility for the prevention of domestic violence and sexual assault in New South Wales, Australia.

The reduction in violence against women was one of the objectives in establishing the Minister for the Status of Women in the third Fahey ministry in 1993. A separate portfolio of Prevention of Domestic Violence and Sexual Assault was created in the second Baird ministry. Women's safety was added to the portfolio title in the second Perrottet ministry. The current minister, since 21 December 2021, is Natalie Ward. The minister supports the Attorney General in the administration of that portfolio. through the Stronger Communities cluster, in particular the Department of Communities and Justice and a range of other government agencies. 

Ultimately, the ministers are responsible to the Parliament of New South Wales.

List of ministers

See also 

List of New South Wales government agencies

References

External links
NSW Department of Justice

Women's Safety and the Prevention of Domestic and Sexual Violence